Vera Zhelikhovsky (April 29, 1835 – May 17, 1896), sometimes transliterated as Vera Jelihovsky, was a Russian writer, mostly of children's stories. She was Madame Blavatsky's sister.

Vera Zhelikhovsky wrote also fantastic stories with heroes having secret knowledge like Cornelius Agrippa, shamans, and Oriental magicians.

English Translations
The General's Will, (Short novel), from Mystery Tales, The Continental Classics Vol 18, Harper and Brothers, 1909.

1835 births
1896 deaths
Writers from Dnipro
Russian fantasy writers
Russian children's writers
Russian women short story writers
Russian women children's writers
Women science fiction and fantasy writers
19th-century women writers from the Russian Empire
19th-century writers from the Russian Empire
19th-century short story writers from the Russian Empire